Imre Galambos (Chinese name 高奕睿, pinyin Gāo Yìruì; born 1967) is a Hungarian Sinologist and Tangutologist who specialises in the study of medieval Chinese and Tangut manuscripts from Dunhuang. He is a professor of Chinese Studies at the Faculty of Asian and Middle Eastern Studies at the University of Cambridge, and a fellow of Robinson College, Cambridge.

Biography
Galambos was born in Szőny, Hungary in 1967, and studied at the Eötvös Loránd University in Budapest. After graduating with an MA in 1994 he went on to study at the University of California, Berkeley, and in 2002 he was awarded a PhD, with a dissertation on Chinese writing during the Warring States period.

Galambos worked at the British Library in London, England from 2002 to 2012, where he was a member of the team working on the International Dunhuang Project. During this time he specialised in the study of Dunhuang manuscripts, and collaborated with Sam van Schaik on a study of a Dunhuang manuscript comprising the letters of a 10th-century Chinese Buddhist monk on pilgrimage from China to India. Whilst at the British Library he also published studies on The General's Garden and other Tangut translations of Chinese military treatises.

Since 2012 Galambos has been a lecturer in the Faculty of Asian and Middle Eastern Studies at the University of Cambridge, where he teaches pre-modern Chinese Studies.

Works
2018. (ed.) of Arthur Cooper's The Other Greek. An Introduction to Chinese and Japanese Characters, Their History and Influence (Leiden: Brill). .
2016. Gerard Clauson's Skeleton Tangut (Hsi Hsia) Dictionary: A facsimile edition. With an introduction by Imre Galambos. With Editorial notes and an Index by Andrew West. Prepared for publication by Michael Everson. Portlaoise: Evertype. .
2015. Translating Chinese Tradition and Teaching Tangut Culture: Manuscripts and Printed Books from Khara-Khoto (open-access). Berlin: DeGruyter. .
 2012. "Consistency in Tangut Translations of Chinese Military Texts". In Irina Fedorovna Popova (ed.), Тангуты в Центральной Азии: сборник статей в честь 80-летия проф. Е.И.Кычанова [Tanguts in Central Asia: a collection of articles marking the 80th anniversary of Prof. E. I. Kychanov] pp. 84–96. Moscow: Oriental Literature. 
 2011. With Sam van Schaik. Manuscripts and Travellers: The Sino-Tibetan Documents of a Tenth-Century Buddhist Pilgrim. Berlin, New York: De Gruyter. 
 2011. "The northern neighbors of the Tangut"; in Cahiers de Linguistique – Asie Orientale 40: 69–104.
 2011. "The Tangut translation of the General’s Garden by Zhuge Liang"; in Written Monuments of the Orient 14(1): 131–142.
 2008. "A 10th-century manuscript from Dunhuang concerning the Gantong monastery at Liangzhou"; Tonkō Shahon Kenkyū Nenpō (敦煌寫本研究年報) 2: 63–82.
 2006. Orthography of Early Chinese Writing: Evidence from Newly Excavated Manuscripts (490–221 BC). Budapest Monographs in East Asian Studies. Budapest: Eötvös Loránd University.

References

External links

 Chinese manuscripts — Galambos' academic blog

1967 births
Eötvös Loránd University alumni
Academics of the University of Cambridge
Hungarian sinologists
Tangutologists
Living people
Fellows of Robinson College, Cambridge